Maria Eugênia "Mia" Mamede (born 24 October 1995) is a Brazilian model, actress and beauty pageant titleholder who was crowned 67th Miss Universe Brasil and was the first woman from her state (Espírito Santo) to win Miss Brazil. As Miss Brazil, Mamede represented Brazil at the Miss Universe 2022 competition, but was failed to placed in Top 16.

Pageantry

Miss Brazil 2022
Mamede represented Vitória in the competition, and went on to win the title. As Miss Espírito Santo, Mamede received the right to represent Espírito Santo at the Miss Brazil 2022 pageant on July 19, 2022. In the competition, Mamede advanced to the top sixteen, then the top ten, and ultimately the top five. At the end of the event, Mamede went on to win the competition and was crowned as Miss Universe Brazil 2022 by outgoing titleholder Teresa Santos of Ceará, becoming the first woman from Espírito Santo to win Miss Brazil.

Miss Universe 2022
Mamede represented Brazil at the Miss Universe 2022 competition on 15th January, 2022 but was unplaced.

References

External links

1995 births
Brazilian beauty pageant winners
Brazilian female models
Living people
Miss Brazil winners
Miss Universe 2022 contestants
People from Vitória, Espírito Santo
New York University alumni